Anarsia subnigricana is a moth of the family Gelechiidae. It was described by Kyu-Tek Park and Margarita Gennadievna Ponomarenko in 1996. It is found in Korea.

References

subnigricana
Moths described in 1996
Moths of Korea